The 2013–14 Ashes (named Commonwealth Bank Ashes Series for sponsorship reasons) was a Test cricket series between England and Australia. The five venues for the series were the Brisbane Cricket Ground, the Adelaide Oval, the WACA Ground, the Melbourne Cricket Ground and the Sydney Cricket Ground.

Australia won the series 5–0 and regained the Ashes for the first time since 2006–07. In doing so, Australia recorded only the third 5–0 Ashes whitewash in history. With 37 wickets and three man of the match awards, Mitchell Johnson was player of the series.

The series was notable for aggressive and hostile fast bowling display by Johnson throughout the series which many analysts described similar to the days of Lillee and Thomson. Johnson's performance was hailed by some in the British media as one of the greatest ever in cricket history and arguably the best of modern era.

Beginning with this series, the four-year cycle of Ashes series in Australia was brought forward one year. This meant this series was held three years after the previous 2010–11 series in Australia and only three months after the end of the 2013 Ashes in England. The schedule for series in England was brought forward by two years, beginning in 2015, which swapped where each series is to be played in subsequent years. This rescheduling was to avoid clashes between Ashes series in Australia and the Cricket World Cup, both previously held very close together in their four-year cycles.

Squads
On 23 September 2013, England announced a 17-man touring party for the Ashes series. Former Ireland international bowler Boyd Rankin, New Zealand-born all-rounder Ben Stokes and Zimbabwe-born batsman Gary Ballance all received call-ups despite being uncapped for England in Tests, while opening batsman Michael Carberry, spin bowler Monty Panesar and seamer Chris Tremlett were also included. Among those who missed out were opening batsman Nick Compton, spin bowler James Tredwell and seamers Graham Onions, who helped Durham win the championship, and Tim Bresnan, although Bresnan was suffering from a back injury and still travelled with the squad to Australia. Matt Prior was the only specialist wicket-keeper in the side; Jonny Bairstow was designated to deputise for him.

On 12 November 2013, Australia announced a 12-man squad for the first Test, including ODI stand-in captain George Bailey, who at that point was still yet to make his Test debut.

On 25 November 2013, Jonathan Trott pulled out of the remainder of the tour citing a stress-related illness.

On 21 December 2013, Graeme Swann retired from international cricket with immediate effect. Two days later, it was announced that leg-spinner Scott Borthwick and off-spinner James Tredwell had been called up following Swann's retirement.

† Late addition

Australia played the same eleven in every test: Warner, Rogers, Watson, Clarke, Smith, Bailey, Haddin, Johnson, Siddle, Harris and Lyon.

Matches

First Test

Australia won the toss and elected to bat, however they were reduced to 6/132 just after lunch on the first day, with Stuart Broad claiming four early wickets. From there, Brad Haddin and Mitchell Johnson added 114 for the seventh wicket before Johnson was dismissed for 64. At stumps on day one, Australia was 8/273, with Haddin on 78.

When play resumed on day two, England took the remaining two Australian wickets quickly to dismiss them for 295. Haddin was run out for 94, while Broad claimed 6/81. In reply, England lost Cook and Trott in the opening session to go to lunch at 2/55. Momentum swung Australia's way when Harris dismissed Pietersen shortly afterwards, sparking a dramatic collapse which saw the visitors crumble to 8/91. Eventually England was bowled out for 136, a deficit of 159. Mitchell Johnson was the main architect of the collapse, taking 4/61. In their second innings, Australia reached 0/65 by the close of play.

Australia increased their advantage on day three, led by David Warner (124) and Michael Clarke (113). Brad Haddin also contributed 53 as Australia declared on 7/401, setting England a target of 561 for victory. In response, England lost Carberry and Trott before the end of the day, finishing on 2/24.

Australia made steady inroads on day four, although at tea England had steadied somewhat at 4/142. However, Lyon dismissed Cook for 65 straight after the resumption, initiating another collapse, which saw the tourists bowled out for 179. A substitute fielder Chris Sabburg, who entered the field for a brief moment, took a widely reported catch that dismissed Kevin Pietersen for 26. Australia won by 381 runs and Mitchell Johnson was named man of the match, claiming 5/42 in the second innings and nine wickets for the match.

Second Test

Australia fielded an unchanged line-up from the first Test, while England brought in Stokes (on debut) and Panesar for Trott and Tremlett. Australia once again won the toss and batted first. They started well, reaching 1/155, but England removed Watson (51) and Rogers (72) in quick succession. Bailey scored an enterprising 53 before being caught off a pull shot. As in the first Test, Australia scored 273 runs on the first day, this time for the loss of five wickets, with Clarke on 48 and Haddin on 7 – both having survived dropped catches in the day.

Clarke and Haddin would go on to add exactly 200 for the sixth wicket, scoring 148 and 118 respectively. Harris scored an unbeaten 55 as Australia declared on 9/570. Johnson claimed the wicket of Cook before stumps on day two as the visitors were left at 1/35.

Australia removed Root and Pietersen to rash strokes on the third morning to see the score 3/66. Carberry and Bell added 45 before Warner removed the former for 60 with a one-handed catch at square leg off the bowling of Watson. This sparked a dramatic collapse for England, with Johnson claiming three wickets in one over shortly after lunch to reduce England to 7/117. Johnson then also claimed the final three wickets to claim figures of 7/40 and bowl out the tourists for 172, a 398-run deficit. Bell was left unbeaten on 72 and Australia decided not to enforce the follow-on. The hosts stumbled in their second innings to 2/4, but recovered to 3/132 at stumps, with Warner not out on 83.

The threat of rain on days four and five prompted Clarke to declare on the overnight score, setting a target of 531 for victory. Cook and Carberry both fell to hook shots in the first session, and England reached lunch at 2/65. Pietersen reached his first half-century of the series but was dismissed shortly afterwards for 53. Bell was out to Smith just before tea and the visitors were still struggling at 4/143. Root made 87 before falling to Lyon and at the close, England had progressed to 6/247.

Broad fell in the first over of day five after a short rain delay, and Prior made 69 before being caught in the deep. From there, Australia quickly wrapped up the innings for 312, resulting in a 218-run victory and a 2–0 series lead. Johnson was once again named man of the match.

Third Test

England replaced Panesar with Bresnan, while Australia again named an unchanged line-up. For the third time in the series, Australia won the toss and batted. Warner made 60 but the hosts quickly stumbled to 5/143. Smith and Haddin rebuilt with a 124-run partnership, which ended when Haddin was caught for 55. Smith reached his hundred and Australia reached the end of the day without further loss at 6/326, with Smith on 103 and Johnson on 39.

England removed Johnson early on the second morning without adding to his overnight score, and shortly afterwards Smith was dismissed for 111. The tourists quickly wrapped up the innings for 385. In response, the England openers added 85 before Carberry was bowled by Harris for 43. Root was dismissed caught behind shortly afterwards. Cook reached 72 before miscuing a cut shot off Lyon, while Pietersen fell to an athletic catch by Johnson at mid-on. At the close, England were 4/180.

Australia efficiently wrapped up the innings on the third morning, dismissing England for 251, a 134-run lead. Warner and Rogers added 157 for the opening partnership before Rogers was caught for 54. Warner reached his century before holing out at long-on for 112, and at the end of play, Australia were 3/235, a lead of 369.

Watson scored 74 runs from just 42 balls on the fourth morning before he was comically run out for 103. Bailey hit 28 off one over from Anderson – the equal record in Test cricket for most runs in one over – following which Clarke declared with the total on 6/369, setting England 504 to win. Harris bowled Cook with the first ball of the innings, but Carberry and Root were able to steady with a 62-run partnership. Both were out in quick succession, and when Pietersen fell for 45, the score was 4/121. However, Bell and Stokes added 99 before Bell was caught behind on DRS review for 60. England reached 5/251 by the close, requiring 252 runs to keep the Ashes alive.

Stokes and Prior frustrated Australia for an hour and a half on the fifth day before Prior was dismissed for 26. Shortly afterwards, Stokes reached his maiden Test century, and the tourists went into lunch at 6/332. However, he was caught by Haddin off the bowling of Lyon for 120 straight after the resumption, and Australia was able to wrap up the innings for 353. Australia won by 150 runs, securing a 3–0 series lead, and with it, their first Ashes series win since 2006–07. Smith was man of the match for his hundred in the first innings.

Fourth Test

Australia's team was unchanged once again, while the sudden retirement of Swann prompted England to select Panesar. Prior was also dropped for Bairstow. Michael Clarke won the toss for the fourth time in the series and elected to bowl. Cook and Carberry started well and added 48 for the opening stand before the former edged Siddle for 27. England's scoring rate was slow and their top order all made starts – Carberry scored 38, Bell made 27 and Root 24, but only Pietersen went on to score a half century. Johnson removed Stokes and Bairstow in quick succession at the end of the day to shift the advantage back to Australia, with the score 6/226 and Pietersen on 67.

Australia dismissed the English tail with little resistance, bowling out the visitors for 255. Pietersen added only one boundary to his overnight score and top-scored with 71. Johnson claimed his third five-wicket haul of the series, taking 5/63. In reply, Australia struggled, stumbling to 5/112. Rogers made 61 but holed out to mid-off and the hosts were in trouble at the end of the day at 9/164. Haddin remained unbeaten on 43 and Anderson and Broad both captured three wickets.

Haddin and Lyon added 40 for the last wicket on the third morning, with the former top-scoring with 65. Australia were dismissed for 204, a deficit of 51 runs. By lunch, England had moved to 0/54 in response, an imposing lead of 105. Johnson trapped Cook in front for 51 and England then collapsed, losing 3/1. Siddle removed Carberry lbw, Johnson ran out Root and Lyon dismissed Bell first ball to see the visitors stumble to 4/87. Stokes and Pietersen added 44 before Stokes holed out to long-off, and Bairstow and Pietersen also added 42 to see the score at 5/173. However, Australia took the last five wickets for just six runs, bowling out England for just 179 and setting 231 for victory. Lyon was the main architect, taking 5/50. By the close of play, Warner and Rogers took the score to 30 without loss.

Australia resumed on the fourth morning needing a further 201 to win, while England needed 10 wickets. Both openers were dropped in the first hour, but Warner was caught behind off Stokes for 25. Rogers and Watson reached lunch with the score 1/143, needing 88 to win. Rogers brought up his century, scoring 116 before he was caught behind off Panesar. Watson also made 83 not out as Australia cantered home to win by eight wickets. Johnson claimed his third man of the match award of the series for his eight wickets.

Fifth Test

Australia named the same team as the previous four Tests, while for England, Ballance, Borthwick and Rankin made their debuts in place of Root, Bresnan and Panesar. Cook won his first toss of the series and elected to bowl first. Australia were quickly reduced to 5/97 before Haddin and Smith added 128 for the sixth wicket; Haddin scored 75 before falling to a catch at slip, and Smith went on to make 115 before being the last man dismissed as Australia were bowled out for 326. Stokes was the best of the English bowlers, claiming six wickets. In reply, England lost Carberry for a duck before the close of play and went to stumps on day one at 1/8.

On day two, another batting collapse saw England lose four wickets for 15 runs, collapsing to 5/23. Stokes scored 47, but further predation by the Australian bowlers had the English all out for 155 at the tea break. Australia then took a 171-run lead into their second innings. In response, Rogers started well for Australia, reaching 73 not out by the end of the second day. The home side reached stumps at 4/140.

Rogers went on to score 119 on the third day, with Bailey also contributing 46. Australia were bowled out for 276, setting England 448 to win. The visitors lasted only 31.4 overs, crumbling for 166; Carberry top-scored with 43, while Harris claimed 5/25. Australia won by 281 runs and secured a series clean sweep, winning the Ashes 5–0. Harris was named man of the match for his eight wickets, while Johnson was man of the series, claiming 37 wickets across the five Tests.

Statistics

Batting
Most runs

Bowling
Most wickets

Broadcasting

See also
 Mitchell Johnson with the Australian cricket team in the 2013–14 Ashes series

References

External links

 England in Australia – The Ashes on ESPN Cricinfo

The Ashes
Ashes series
Ashes series
Ashes